Hein Htet may refer to:
 Hein Htet (film editor)
 Hein Htet (actor)